Karl Arthur Marlantes (born December 24, 1944) is an American author and Vietnam War veteran. He has written three books: Matterhorn: A Novel of the Vietnam War (2010), What it is Like to go to War (2011), and Deep River (2019).

Biography

Early life 
Marlantes grew up in Seaside, Oregon, a small, coastal logging town. He played football and was student body president at Seaside High School, from which he graduated in 1963. His father was the school principal.

He won a National Merit Scholarship and attended Yale University, where he was a member of Jonathan Edwards College and Beta Theta Pi, and played as wing forward in the rugby team. During his time at Yale, Marlantes trained in the Marine Corps Platoon Leaders Class. He was awarded a Rhodes Scholarship at University College, Oxford. He returned to Oxford after his military service and earned a master's degree.

Vietnam War 
Marlantes left after one semester at Oxford to join active duty in the U.S. Marine Corps as an infantry officer. He served during the Vietnam War with 1st Battalion, 4th Marines from October 1968 to October 1969, and was awarded the Navy Cross for action in Vietnam in which he led an assault on a hilltop bunker complex. He also served as an aerial observer while in Vietnam. Marlantes was also awarded a Bronze Star, two Navy Commendation Medals for valor, two Purple Hearts, and 10 Air Medals.

He served another year of active duty at Marine Corps Headquarters after his combat tour. He suffers from post-traumatic stress disorder.

Marlantes is featured in Ken Burns' and Lynn Novick's 10-part documentary series, The Vietnam War (2017), where he reflects on his experiences during the war.

Literary career 
Marlantes is the author of Matterhorn: A Novel of the Vietnam War (2010). Sebastian Junger of The New York Times declared Matterhorn: "one of the most profound and devastating novels ever to come out of Vietnam - or any war". It received the 2011 Washington State Book Award in the fiction category. The novel is based on Marlantes' combat experience in the Vietnam War.

His next book was "What It Is Like to Go to War," a biographical non-fiction work published in 2011 about his return to the civilian world and modern veteran life in general.

Marlantes's novel Deep River (2019) was published in July 2019. It follows a Finnish family which flees Finland and settles in the Pacific Northwest in a logging community. The story examines the logging industry and labor movements of the early 1900s and rebuilding a family in America while balancing family tradition.

Published works

Footnotes 

Sources

External links 

 
 
 
 

1944 births
21st-century American novelists
Alumni of University College, Oxford
American male non-fiction writers
American male novelists
United States Marine Corps personnel of the Vietnam War
21st-century American memoirists
American people of Finnish descent
American people of Greek descent
American people of Norwegian descent
American Rhodes Scholars
Businesspeople from Oregon
Living people
Novelists from Oregon
People from Seaside, Oregon
Recipients of the Air Medal
Recipients of the Navy Cross (United States)
United States Marine Corps officers
Yale University alumni
21st-century American male writers
Military personnel from Oregon